Kill Your Friends is the debut novel by the Scottish writer John Niven. It was published in 2008 by William Heinemann.

Plot summary

The novel is set in 1997 at the height of the Britpop music scene. The protagonist, Steven Stelfox, is unhappy about his current position as an A&R agent in the record company he works for in London.  Stelfox, uninterested in most music, is jealous of his coworkers' success in finding successful musical acts and attempts to climb the career ladder amidst competition.

Critical response

The protagonist and plot have been compared to American Psycho and been described as "mad, gleeful nastiness". The work is considered satirical, and is described as an "all-out assault" by The Independent, and as having "the horrible, slightly metallic tang of total authenticity" by the Philadelphia Weekly.

Film adaptation

A feature film was made based on the novel, directed by Owen Harris, with a script written by John Niven. Nicholas Hoult, Craig Roberts, Tom Riley, and Georgia King star in the film.

References

Scottish novels
2008 British novels
Fiction set in 1997
Novels set in London
Heinemann (publisher) books
Novels set in the 1990s
British novels adapted into films
2008 debut novels